Minerva (minor planet designation: 93 Minerva) is a large trinary main-belt asteroid. It is a C-type asteroid, meaning that it has a dark surface and possibly a primitive carbonaceous composition. It was discovered by J. C. Watson on 24 August 1867, and named after Minerva, the Roman equivalent of Athena, goddess of wisdom. An occultation of a star by Minerva was observed in France, Spain and the United States on 22 November 1982. An occultation diameter of ~170 km was measured from the observations. Since then two more occultations have been observed, which give an estimated mean diameter of ~150 km for diameter.

Satellites
On 16 August 2009, at 13:36 UT, the Keck Observatory's adaptive optics system revealed that the asteroid 93 Minerva possesses 2 small moons. They are 4 and 3 km in diameter and the projected separations from Minerva correspond to 630 km (8.8 x  Rprimary) and 380 km (5.2 x  Rprimary) respectively. They have been named Aegis and Gorgoneion.

References

External links 
 
 

000093
Discoveries by James Craig Watson
Named minor planets
000093
000093
000093
000093
18670824